Ernest Hubert (1899–1988) was a Swiss painter.

20th-century Swiss painters
Swiss male painters
1899 births
1988 deaths
20th-century Swiss male artists